The Norfolk Tides are a Minor League Baseball team of the International League and the Triple-A affiliate of the Baltimore Orioles. They are located in Norfolk, Virginia, and are named in nautical reference to the city's location on the Chesapeake Bay. The team plays their home games at Harbor Park, which opened in 1993. The Tides previously played at High Rock Park in 1961 and 1962, Frank D. Lawrence Stadium from 1961 to 1969, and at Met Park from its opening in 1970 until the end of the 1992 season.

Originally known as the Portsmouth-Norfolk Tides, the team began play in 1961 as members of the Class A South Atlantic League. In 1963, they joined the  Carolina League and became known as the Tidewater Tides, taking their geographic identifier from the Tidewater region. The Tides were replaced by a Triple-A International League team in 1969. The Triple-A Tides carried on the history of the Class A team that preceded them. The club rebranded as the Norfolk Tides in 1993. In conjunction with Major League Baseball's reorganization of Minor League Baseball in 2021, the Tides were placed in the Triple-A East, which was renamed the International League in 2022.

The team has won six league championships in its history. They won the Carolina League championship in 1965 as the Class A affiliate of the Chicago White Sox. During their 38-year Triple-A affiliation with the New York Mets from 1969 to 2006, they won the Governors' Cup, the championship of the International League, on five occasions (1972, 1975, 1982, 1983, and 1985) and won the Triple-A World Series in 1983.

History

Before the Tides
Both Norfolk and Portsmouth, Virginia, first hosted professional baseball teams in the late 19th century. Among the clubs to hail from these neighboring cities were the Norfolk Tars, which played on and off from 1906 to 1955 primarily in the Virginia League and Piedmont League; the Portsmouth Truckers, which played at intervals from 1895 to 1935 mostly in the Virginia League; the Portsmouth Cubs of the Piedmont League from 1936 to 1952; and the Portsmouth Merrimacs also of the Piedmont League from 1953 to 1955. The Tars folded in July 1955 due to low attendance and steep financial losses. Fiscal problems also caused the Merrimacs to cease operations after the 1955 campaign.

South Atlantic League (1961–1962)
Six years after the loss of the Tars and Merrimacs, the Portsmouth-Norfolk Tides were established as members of the Class A South Atlantic League. They played some home games at Frank D. Lawrence Stadium in Portsmouth and some at High Rock Park in Norfolk. The Tides had a limited affiliation with Major League Baseball's Kansas City Athletics. Their inaugural season opener was a 7–4 victory in Portsmouth over the Charlotte Hornets with 3,158 people in attendance on April 17, 1961. In 1962, they became an affiliate of the St. Louis Cardinals. The Tides dropped out of the Sally League after losing their working agreement with St. Louis and following what Tides general manager Marshall Fox called "unfair treatment" by the league.

Carolina League (1963–1968)

The Carolina League, a Class A circuit, accepted the Tides as members for 1963. At this point, the team became known as the Tidewater Tides, taking their geographic identifier from the Tidewater region, and began playing their home games exclusively at Lawrence Stadium in Portsmouth. They were not affiliated with any Major League Baseball team in their first Carolina League season.

The Tides became the Class A affiliate of the Chicago White Sox in 1964. Under manager Allen Jones, they qualified for the playoffs that year for the first time in team history and defeated the Kinston Eagles in the semifinals to advance to the championship round where they lost to the Winston-Salem Red Sox. Outfielder Ed Stroud won the league's Most Valuable Player (MVP) Award.  Jones led the team back to the postseason in 1965. After defeating the Peninsula Grays in the semifinals, the Tides won the Carolina League championship by sweeping the Durham Bulls, 2–0.

Tidewater became an affiliate of the Philadelphia Phillies in 1966. They made the postseason in 1967 and 1968, but they were defeated in the finals by Durham in 1967 and eliminated in the quarterfinals by the Raleigh-Durham Mets in 1968.

International League

New York Mets (1969–2006)

In 1969, the New York Mets moved their Triple-A International League (IL) affiliate, the Jacksonville Suns, from Jacksonville, Florida, to Portsmouth as the Tidewater Tides. The team was operated by Tidewater Professional Sports and owned by the Mets. The Triple-A Tides carried on the history of the Class A team that preceded them.

International League Manager of the Year Clyde McCullough led the team to a league-best 76–59 record in their first Triple-A season, but they were eliminated in the semifinals of the Governors' Cup playoffs to determine the IL championship. The 1969 season was the team's last at Lawrence Stadium. They moved into the new Met Park, located in Norfolk, in 1970. After another semifinal exit that year, the Tides reached the finals in 1971 but lost the championship to the Rochester Red Wings in the full five-game series. Hank Bauer, manager of the 1972 club, led the Tides to win their first Governors' Cup with a 3–2 series defeat of the Louisville Colonels in the finals. Following this win, Tidewater competed in the Kodak World Baseball Championship, a five-team round-robin tournament that included the champions of the American Association (the Evansville Triplets) and Pacific Coast League (the Albuquerque Dukes), the Caribbean All-Stars, and the hosting Hawaii Islanders. The Tides went 3–2 but were  eliminated. Bauer was selected as the 1972 IL Manager of the Year. The club returned to the playoffs in 1973 but could not advance past the semifinals.

Tidewater finished atop the league standings in 1974 with an 86–55 record under manager Joe Frazier. After sweeping the Charleston Charlies, 3–0, in the semis, they won the IL championship over the Syracuse Chiefs, 3–1. Afterwards, they met the Evansville Triplets, champions of the American Association, in the Junior World Series, which the Tides lost, 4–1. The Tides swept the 1975 International League year-end awards with outfielder Mike Vail as the IL MVP and Rookie of the Year, Craig Swan as the Most Valuable Pitcher, and Frazier as Manager of the Year.

They next appeared in the postseason in 1977, 1979, and 1981, but they were unable to move on past the semifinals. During this stretch, Juan Berenguer won the 1978 Most Valuable Pitcher Award, and outfielder Mookie Wilson won the 1979 Rookie of the Year Award. Tidewater won back-to-back Governors' Cups in 1982 and 1983. Jack Aker's 1982 club swept the Columbus Clippers, 3–0, in the semifinals and did the same against Rochester in the finals. Under Davey Johnson in 1983, the Tides dispatched Columbus in the semis, and then won a second consecutive IL title over the Richmond Braves. That postseason, the Tides, the American Association champion Denver Bears, and Pacific Coast League champion Portland Beavers contested the Triple-A World Series, a round-robin tournament to crown an overall champion of the classification. Tidewater won the series, 3–1. Walt Terrell was the IL's Most Valuable Pitcher for 1973.

In 1985, Bob Schaefer led the team to its sixth and final Governors' Cup championship with a semifinal victory over the Maine Guides and a finals win over Columbus. Though the Tides would remain members of the International League for the next 35 years, they were unable to win another league crown. They lost in the semifinals in 1986 and suffered defeats in the finals of both 1987 and 1988. John Mitchell was selected as the IL Most Valuable Pitcher for 1986. First baseman Randy Milligan won both the 1987 MVP and Rookie of the Year Awards. Third basemen Tom O'Malley (1989) and Jeff Manto (1994) later won IL MVP Awards.

The club went through a season of change from 1992 to 1993. First, in December 1992, the Mets sold the franchise to a group led by Tampa businessman Ken Young. The Triple-A affiliation between the teams remained intact. In 1993, the Tides left Met Park and moved into the new US$16-million Harbor Park. As they moved into the new facility, the team also replaced the "Tidewater" in its name with that of Norfolk. Also in 1993, the Tides introduced their mascot, Rip Tide. The franchise was awarded the 1993 John H. Johnson President's Award, recognizing them as the "complete baseball franchise—based on franchise stability, contributions to league stability, contributions to baseball in the community, and promotion of the baseball industry."

The 1995 Tides led the league with their 86–56 record but were eliminated in the Governors' Cup finals by the Ottawa Lynx. They did, however, win all four IL year-end awards: MVP (third baseman/outfielder Butch Huskey, Most Valuable Pitcher and Rookie of the Year (Jason Isringhausen, and Manager of the Year (Toby Harrah). Norfolk made three more playoff appearances as a Mets affiliate, exiting in the semifinal rounds of 1996, 2001, and 2005. Mike Fyhrie won the 1996 Most Valuable Pitcher Award, and first baseman Roberto Petagine was the 1997 IL MVP. The 38-year Triple-A affiliation with New York ended after the 2006 season when the Mets elected to affiliate with the New Orleans Zephyrs for 2007.

Baltimore Orioles (2007–2020)

Norfolk became the Triple-A affiliate of the Baltimore Orioles in 2007. The Orioles preferred the quality of the facilities at Harbor Park as well as the more favorable weather and proximity of Norfolk compared to their previous location in Ottawa. Maryland Baseball Holding, the Tides' ownership group led by Ken Young, also owned two other Orioles-affiliated teams at the time: the Bowie Baysox and Frederick Keys.

From 2007 to 2014, the Tides regularly finished with losing records and only finished at or above .500 in 2009, 2012, and 2013. The 2015 team, led by IL Manager of the Year Ron Johnson qualified for the Governors' Cup playoffs as winners of the Southern Division title but lost in the semifinals to Columbus in five games. The Tides added a second mascot, a green sea creature named Triton, in 2016. Norfolk continued to post losing seasons from 2016 to 2019. In 2019, first baseman Ryan Mountcastle was selected as the IL MVP. The start of the 2020 season was initially postponed due to the COVID-19 pandemic before being cancelled altogether.

Triple-A East / International League

Baltimore Orioles (2021–present)

Following the 2020 season, Major League Baseball assumed control of Minor League Baseball in a move to increase player salaries, modernize facility standards, and reduce travel. The Tides were organized into the Triple-A East and maintained their affiliation with the Baltimore Orioles. Norfolk ended the season in sixth place in the Southeastern Division with a 48–72 record. No playoffs were held to determine a league champion; instead, the team with the best regular-season record was declared the winner. However, 10 games that had been postponed from the start of the season were reinserted into the schedule as a postseason tournament called the Triple-A Final Stretch in which all 30 Triple-A clubs competed for the highest winning percentage. Norfolk finished the tournament tied for 20th place with a 4–6 record. In 2022, the Triple-A East became known as the International League, the name historically used by the regional circuit prior to the 2021 reorganization.

Season-by-season records

Radio and television

All Tides home and road games are broadcast on ESPN 94.1 WVSP-FM. Live audio broadcasts are also available online through the station's website as well as on the team's website and the MiLB First Pitch app. Games can be viewed through the MiLB.TV subscription feature of the official website of Minor League Baseball, with audio provided by a radio simulcast.

As of 2021, Pete Michaud is the play-by-play announcer. Several former Tides broadcasters have gone on to work in Major League Baseball or other major league sports, including: Ford C. Frick Award winner Marty Brennaman (1970–1973), Pete Van Wieren (1974–1975), Larry Matson (1976), Bob Rathbun (1980–1985, 1990), Charlie Slowes (1986, 1991–1992), Ken Levine (1989–1990), and Bob Socci (2006–2011).

Roster

Awards 

The franchise has been awarded these honors by Minor League Baseball.

One player won a league award in recognition for their performance with Tidewater in the Carolina League.

Fifteen players, five managers, and two executives have won league awards in recognition for their performance with Tidewater/Norfolk in the International League.

Managers

Norfolk has had 33 managers since their inaugural 1961 season.

Notes

References

External links

 
 Statistics from Baseball-Reference

 
1961 establishments in Virginia
Baltimore Orioles minor league affiliates
Baseball teams established in 1961
Chicago White Sox minor league affiliates
Carolina League teams
International League teams
Kansas City Athletics minor league affiliates
New York Mets minor league affiliates
Philadelphia Phillies minor league affiliates
Professional baseball teams in Virginia
South Atlantic League (1904–1963) teams
Sports in Norfolk, Virginia
St. Louis Cardinals minor league affiliates
Triple-A East teams